Baccaurea angulata, also known as belimbing hutan or belimbing darah in Malay and more locally as ucong or embaling, is a species of flowering plant, a fruit tree in the tampoi family, that is native to Southeast Asia.

Description
The species grows as a dioecious tree to 6–21 m in height, with a 2–5 m bole. The smooth, oval leaves are 12–30 cm long by 4–14 cm wide. The inflorescences of cream to yellow flowers are clustered along the bole and branches. The fruits are berries, 5–6 cm long by 2.3–2.6 cm in diameter, have a star-shaped cross-section, and are dark purple when immature, ripening bright red, with the seeds contained in an edible, white arillode.

Distribution and habitat
The species is endemic to Borneo. It occurs in lowland and hill mixed dipterocarp, riverine and secondary forests, up to an elevation of 800 m.

Usage
The species is often cultivated in villages as well as the fruits being collected from the wild and sold in markets. The epicarp may be made into preserves and the pulp juiced.

References

 
angulata
Endemic flora of Borneo
Fruits originating in Asia
Plants described in 1929
Taxa named by Elmer Drew Merrill
Flora of the Borneo lowland rain forests